M-Train (stylised as M>Train) was a train operator in Melbourne, Australia, and operated some of the city's suburban rail operations. Formed in October 1997 as Bayside Trains, a business unit of the Public Transport Corporation, it was privatised in August 1999 becoming a subsidiary of National Express.

In December 2002 National Express handed the franchise in, with the State Government taking over until negotiations were concluded for Connex Melbourne to take over in April 2004.

History
On 1 October 1997 in preparation for privatisation, the Public Transport Corporation's suburban rail operations were split into two business units, Bayside Trains and Hillside Trains. The former took over operation of the Frankston, Cranbourne, Pakenham, Sandringham, Williamstown, Werribee, Sydenham (now Sunbury), Broadmeadows (now Craigieburn) and Upfield line services.

Bayside Trains initially operated service on the Orbost line as far as Warragul under contract to V/Line until electric services ceased beyond Pakenham. On 1 July 1998, operation of the Stony Point line was transferred from V/Line.

National Express successfully bid to take over the Bayside Trains services from 29 August 1999 beating competition from Connex, GB Railways and a Singapore MRT led consortium. National Express were also awarded the Swanston Trams franchise and V/Line concession.

In October 2000 National Express rebranded Bayside Trains as M-Train.

In December 2002 National Express handed in its Victorian rail and tram franchises having been unable to renegotiate financial terms with the State Government who took over operations.

KPMG were appointed to operate the business on behalf of the State Government. In May 2003 the State Government announced it would establish a single company to operate both networks, and was negotiating with Connex Melbourne (who operated the other half of the network) to operate this entity. In February 2004 an agreement was reached, and the networks were reunited on 18 April 2004.

Operations

M-Train operated the suburban rail services in the western, north-western, south-eastern, and southern suburbs running through North Melbourne and South Yarra stations. These were the Werribee, Williamstown, Sydenham (now Sunbury), Broadmeadows (now Craigieburn), Upfield, Pakenham, Cranbourne, Frankston, Sandringham and Stony Point lines, in addition to maintaining the three underground City Loop stations.

When the Public Transport Corporation fleet was split, Bayside Trains were allocated 58 three-car Hitachi and 97 three-car Comeng sets. A class locomotives and MTH carriages were hired from V/Line for services on the unelectrified Stony Point line.

To replace the Hitachis, 62 three-car Siemens Nexas were ordered.

Until November 2003 M-Train also issued its own annual railway tickets, running in parallel and sold at a discount to those Metcard system, but only permitting travel on their half of the network.

References

External links

Defunct railway companies of Australia
National Express companies
Rail transport in Victoria (Australia)
Railway companies established in 1997
Railway companies disestablished in 2004
1997 establishments in Australia
2004 disestablishments in Australia